Aftab Habib (born 7 February 1972) is an English former international cricketer.

Habib was formerly the Hong Kong national coach, having been appointed on a three-year contract, including Hong Kong's appearance in the 2008 Asia Cup in Pakistan and has worked as Women's and Girls’ Cricket Development Officer for the Buckinghamshire Cricket Board. He is currently Head Coach of Berkshire Women, having been appointed at the start of the 2016 season.

In county cricket he represented Leicestershire and Essex, after having been on the books at Middlesex. With Leicestershire, he broke the 1,000 first-class run barrier in both the 1999 and 2000 seasons and won the County Championship in 1998.

In 1999, he played two test matches for England in a 2–1 home series loss to New Zealand.

He is of Pakistani heritage.

References

External links
 

1972 births
Living people
Berkshire cricketers
British sportspeople of Pakistani descent
British Asian cricketers
Canterbury cricketers
English cricket coaches
English cricketers
English people of Pakistani descent
England Test cricketers
Essex cricketers
Coaches of the Hong Kong national cricket team
Leicestershire cricketers
Middlesex cricketers
People educated at Millfield Preparatory School
People educated at Taunton School
Sportspeople from Reading, Berkshire